Natural resistance-associated macrophage protein 2 (NRAMP 2), also known as divalent metal transporter 1 (DMT1) and divalent cation transporter 1 (DCT1), is a protein that in humans is encoded by the SLC11A2 (solute carrier family 11, member 2) gene. DMT1 represents a large family of orthologous metal ion transporter proteins that are highly conserved from bacteria to humans.

As its name suggests, DMT1 binds a variety of divalent metals including cadmium (Cd2+), copper (Cu2+), and zinc (Zn2+,); however, it is best known for its role in transporting ferrous iron (Fe2+). DMT1 expression is regulated by body iron stores to maintain iron homeostasis. DMT1 is also important in the absorption and transport of manganese (Mn2+). In the digestive tract, it is located on the apical membrane of enterocytes, where it carries out H+-coupled transport of divalent metal cations from the intestinal lumen into the cell.

Function 
Iron is not only essential for the human body, it is required for all organisms in order for them to be able to grow. Iron also participates in many metabolic pathways. Iron deficiency can lead to iron-deficiency anemia thus iron regulation is very crucial in the human body.

In mammals 
The process of iron transportation consists of iron being reduced by ferrireductases that are present on the cell surface or by dietary reductants such as ascorbate (Vitamin C). Once the Fe3+ has been reduced to Fe2+, the DMT1 transporter protein transports the Fe2+ ions into the cells that line the small intestine (enterocytes). From there, the ferroportin/IREG1 transporter exports it across the cell membrane where is it oxidized to Fe3+ on the surface of the cell then bound by transferrin and released into the blood stream.

Ion selectivity 
DMT1 is not a 100% selective transporter as it also transports Zn2+, Mn2+, and Ca2+ which can lead to toxicity problems. The reason for this is because it cannot distinguish the difference between the different metal ions due to low selectivity for iron ions. In addition, it causes the metal ions to compete for transportation and the concentration of iron ions is typically substantially lower than that of other ions.

Yeast vs. mammal pathway 
The iron uptake pathway in Saccharaomyces cerevisiae, which consists of a multicopper ferroxidase (Fet3) and an iron plasma permease (FTR1) has a high affinity for iron uptake compared to the DMT1 iron uptake process present in mammals. The iron uptake process in yeasts consists of Fe3+ which is reduced to Fe2+ by ferriductases. Ferrous iron may also be present outside of the cell due to other reductants present in the extracellular medium. Ferrous iron is then oxidized to ferric iron by Fet3 on the external surface of the cell. Then Fe3+ is transferred from Fet3 to FTR1 and transferred across the cell membrane into the cell.

Ferrous-oxidase mediated transport systems exist in order to transport specific ions opposed to DMT1, which does not have complete specificity. The Fet3/FTR1 iron uptake pathway is able to achieve complete specificity for iron over other ions due to the multi-step nature of the pathway. Each of the steps involved in the pathway is specific to either ferrous iron or ferric iron. The DMT1 transporter protein does not have specificity over the ions it transports because it is unable to distinguish between Fe2+ and the other divalent metal ions it transfer through the cell membrane. Although, the reason that non-specific ion transporters, such as DMT1, exist is due to their ability to function in anaerobic environments opposed to the Fet3/FTR1 pathway which requires oxygen as a co substrate. So in anaerobic environments the oxidase would not be able to function thus another means of iron uptake is necessary.

Role in neurodegenerative diseases 
Toxic accumulation of divalent metals, especially iron and/or manganese, are frequently discussed aetiological factors in a variety of neurodegenerative diseases, including Alzheimer's disease, Parkinson's disease, amyotrophic lateral sclerosis, and multiple sclerosis. DMT1 may be the major transporter of manganese across the blood brain barrier and expression of this protein in the nasal epithelium provides a route for direct absorption of metals into the brain. DMT1 expression in the brain may increase with age, increasing susceptibility to metal induced pathologies. DMT1 expression is found to be increased in the substantia nigra of Parkinson's patients and in the ventral mesencephalon of animal models intoxicated with 1-methyl-4-phenyl-1,2,3,6-tetrahydropyridine (MPTP) - a neurotoxin widely used experimentally to produce Parkinsonian symptoms.

The DMT1 encoding gene SLC11A2 is located on the long arm of chromosome 12 (12q13) close to susceptibility regions for Alzheimer's disease and restless legs syndrome. The C allele of SNP rs407135 on the DMT1 encoding gene SLC11A2 is associated with shorter disease duration in cases of spinal onset amyotrophic lateral sclerosis, and is implicated in Alzheimer's disease onset in males as well. The CC haplotype for SNPs 1254T/C IVS34+44C/A is associated with Parkinson's disease susceptibility. Finally, variant alleles on several SLC11A2 SNPs are associated with iron anemia, a risk factor for manganese intoxication and restless legs syndrome.

References

Further reading

External links 
 

Solute carrier family